The Battle of Ctesiphon took place in 263 between the Sassanid Empire and Palmyrene army under the Palmyrene king Odaenathus (Palmyra was then an allied state of Rome and officially part of the latter Empire). Following the Sasanians' defeat and loss of Syria and Cappadocia to the Roman Empire at the hands of Odaenathus and Balista; The Palmyrene monarch invaded Mesopotamia and stood at the walls of Ctesiphon and devastated the region around it, however he could not conquer it. The logistical problems of fighting in enemy territory forced the Palmyrenes to leave the siege carrying with them numerous prisoners and booty. The prisoners were sent to Rome, enabling the Roman emperor Gallienus to hold a triumph.

References

263
Ctesiphon 263
Ctesiphon 263
260s in the Roman Empire
3rd century in Iran
Ctesiphon 263
Sieges of Ctesiphon